Chris Q Doe (Born 1958) is a professor of Biology, and Howard Hughes Medical Institute investigator at the Institute for Neuroscience, University of Oregon, Eugene, Oregon. Doe did his PhD work with Corey Goodman at Stanford University, followed by postdoctoral fellowship with Matthew P. Scott at University of Colorado Boulder. He is a researcher in developmental biology known for his studies on neurogenesis in Drosophila melanogaster neural stem cell neuroblasts. His lab investigates the generation of neuronal diversity and neural circuit formation in Drosophila melanogaster. Doe is also a member of the National Academy of Sciences.

Awards and honours
Member, American Academy of Arts and Sciences (2014)
Investigator, Howard Hughes Medical Institute (1994)
Fellow, American Association for the Advancement of Science
Member, National Academy of Sciences (2017)
Fellow, Searle Scholars Program (1990)
Award, NIH MERIT award (2013)
Award, Presidential Young Investigator Award (1990)
Helen Hay Whitney Foundation, Postdoctoral fellow (1987)
National Science Foundation, Predoctoral fellow (1981)

References

External links
Chris Doe lab webpage

University of Oregon faculty
1958 births
Living people
Place of birth missing (living people)
Howard Hughes Medical Investigators
21st-century American biologists